Novgorod Oblast Television is a television channel in the area of Novgorod Oblast. The television channel set up in April 2004 and is registered as mass media since April 18, 2005.

History
December 20, 1991 by the Ministry of Press and Mass Media of the Russian Federation on the basis of the Committee for Television and Radio Novoblispolkoma established the first Novgorod Broadcasting Company "Slavia", and in 2004 it was reorganized as an autonomous non-profit organization " Novgorod regional television".

Novgorod Oblast Television was created in connection with the reform of state TV as well as regional television and radio across Russia from subsidiaries - separate legal entities - have been converted into offices All-Russia State Television and Radio Broadcasting Company and by thus losing legal and financial autonomy.

References

Russian-language television stations in Russia
Mass media companies of Russia
Television channels and stations established in 2004
Veliky Novgorod
Companies based in Veliky Novgorod